The 1929 Kansas Jayhawks football team represented the University of Kansas in the Big Six Conference during the 1929 college football season. In their second season under head coach Bill Hargiss, the Jayhawks compiled a 4–4 record (2–3 against conference opponents), finished in fifth place in the conference, and outscored opponents by a combined total of 97 to 50. They played their home games at Memorial Stadium in Lawrence, Kansas. Steward Lyman was the team captain.

Schedule

References

Kansas
Kansas Jayhawks football seasons
Kansas Jayhawks football